The Subaru Suiren Original name : スバルスイレン - was a concept made by Fuji Heavy Industries - It was proposed as a sport utility wagon / stylish touring pickup with a detachable canopy & large 'indestructible' plastic windows, allowing it to be turned into a sport utility wagon. The Suiren appeared to be a direct replacement for the BRAT / Brumby / MV Pick-up - however as it was an concept-only model, it was never officially developed any further.

The name Suiren is Japanese for Water Lily - a reference to activities in lakes & woodlands ...

Design 

This concept ( designer Unknown ) was developed in Japan about the early 1990's & introduced / displayed at the 1993 Tokyo motor show. It featured a detachable rear canopy, with light weight / high impact plastic window glass. Based on the Impreza platform, the proposal included the use of full time 4WD for stability & comfort, with the convenience & utility of a Pickup.

Technical 

It was to be powered by a 2.5 litre 16 valve DOHC flat-4 engine with a Prodrive semi-automatic developed for WRC racing, with control buttons on the steering wheel - Including a Rally-derived full time 4WD & Viscous LSD equipped center differential transmission system & multi-link suspension. Approx. Weight : 1700 Kg

Links 

 https://www.subaru-impreza.de/Studien/Suiren/SuirenEng.htm
 https://www.allcarindex.com/auto-car-model/Japan-Subaru-Suiren
 https://carsthatnevermadeitetc.tumblr.com/post/163419835840/subaru-suiren-1993-a-concept-pick-up-with-a
 https://www.xn--gp-fka.de/Studien/Suiren/index.htm
 https://www.drive.com.au/caradvice/the-next-generation-subaru-brumby-that-never-was
 https://images.drive.com.au/driveau/image/upload/c_fill,f_auto,g_auto,h_540,q_auto:good,w_960/cms/uploads/gzxwfvbi8jrkeocy133n
 https://viruscars.com/the-next-generation-subaru-brumby-that-never-was/
 https://youtu.be/Cs6VLqUW17c?t=192

References 

Sports cars
Coupés
2000s cars
Cars introduced in 1999
All-wheel-drive vehicles
Concept cars